The 1964 Houston Colt .45s season was the team's 3rd season in Major League Baseball. It involved the Houston Colt .45s finishing in ninth place in the National League with a record of 66–96, 27 games behind the eventual World Series champion St. Louis Cardinals. It was their final season for the team at Colt Stadium before relocating their games to the Astrodome in 1965, along with the accompanying name change to the "Astros" for the '65 season.

Offseason 
On April 8, just a few days before Opening Day, Colt .45s pitcher Jim Umbricht died of cancer. Umbricht had come back from cancer in 1963 to pitch in 35 games, but it returned during the offseason. His uniform number 32 would be retired by the Astros the following season.

Notable transactions 
 October 10, 1963: Claude Raymond was drafted by the Colt .45s from the Milwaukee Braves in a 1963 special draft.

Regular season 
On April 23, Houston pitcher Ken Johnson became the first pitcher in major league history to lose a complete game no-hitter in nine innings when he was beaten 1–0 by the Cincinnati Reds. Cincinnati's Pete Rose scored the only run of the game in the ninth inning, when he reached second base on an error and later scored.

Season standings

Record vs. opponents

Opening Day starters 
Bob Aspromonte
John Bateman
Walt Bond
Nellie Fox
Eddie Kasko
Jim Owens
Pete Runnels
Rusty Staub
Jimmy Wynn

Notable transactions 
 May 26, 1964: Walt Williams was selected off waivers from the Colt .45s by the St. Louis Cardinals.

Roster

Player stats

Batting

Starters by position 
Note: Pos = Position; G = Games played; AB = At bats; R = Runs scored; H = Hits; 2B = Doubles; 3B = Triples; Avg. = Batting average; HR = Home runs; RBI = Runs batted in; SB = Stolen bases
Positional abbreviations: C = Catcher; 1B = First base; 2B = Second base; 3B = Third base; SS = Shortstop; LF = Left field; CF = Center field; RF = Right field

Other batters 
Note: G = Games played; AB = At bats; R = Runs scored; H = Hits; 2B = Doubles; 3B = Triples; Avg. = Batting average; HR = Home runs; RBI = Runs batted in; SB = Stolen bases

 Pitching 

 Starting pitchers Note: G = Games pitched; GS = Games started; IP = Innings pitched; W = Wins; L = Losses; ERA = Earned run average; R = Runs allowed; ER = Earned runs allowed; BB = Walks allowed; K = Strikeouts 

 Other pitchers Note: G = Games pitched; GS = Games started; IP = Innings pitched; W = Wins; L = Losses; SV = Saves; ERA = Earned run average; R = Runs allowed; ER = Earned runs allowed; BB = Walks allowed; K = Strikeouts 

 Relief pitchers Note: G = Games pitched; IP = Innings pitched; W = Wins; L = Losses; SV = Saves; ERA = Earned run average; R = Runs allowed; ER = Earned runs allowed; BB = Walks allowed; K = Strikeouts''

Farm system 

LEAGUE CHAMPIONS: San Antonio

Statesville affiliation shared with Boston Red Sox

References

External links
1964 Houston Colt .45s season at Baseball Reference
Colt .45s on Baseball Almanac (Archived 2009-05-04)

Houston Astros seasons
Houston Colt .45s season
Houston Astro